The Tour du Grand Montréal was an annual women's road bicycle racing stage-race in Canada, between 2002 and 2009. It was rated by the UCI as a 2.1 category race.

Winners

 

Source

References

External links

 
Women's road bicycle races
Defunct cycling races in Canada
Recurring sporting events established in 2002
2002 establishments in Quebec
Recurring sporting events disestablished in 2009
Sports competitions in Montreal
2009 disestablishments in Quebec